Titus Quinctius Atta (died 77 BC) was a Roman comedy writer, and, like Titinius and Afranius, was distinguished as a writer of fabulae togatae, national comedies.

Works
He had the reputation of being a vivid delineator of character, especially female. He also seems to have published a collection of epigrams. 
The scanty fragments contain many archaisms, but are lively in style. According to Horace (Epistles, ii 1. 79), the plays of Atta were still put on the stage in his lifetime.

Surviving Titles and Fragments
We only have the titles (and associated fragments) of twelve of Atta's plays.

References

Attribution:
 Endnotes:
Aulus Gellius vii. 9
Fragments in Neukirch, De fabula togata 18 manorum (1833)
Otto Ribbeck, Comicorum Latinorum reliquiae (1855).

Old Latin-language writers
Ancient Roman writers
Ancient Roman comic dramatists
77 BC deaths
Year of birth unknown
1st-century BC Romans